The 2016 UCI Asia Tour was the 12th season of the UCI Asia Tour. The season began on 20 February 2016 with the Le Tour de Filipinas and ended on 2 October 2016 with the Tour of Almaty.

The points leader, based on the cumulative results of previous races, wears the UCI Asia Tour cycling jersey. Samad Pourseyedi (378 points) from Iran is the defending champion of the 2015 UCI Asia Tour.

Throughout the season, points are awarded to the top finishers of stages within stage races and the final general classification standings of each of the stages races and one-day events. The quality and complexity of a race also determines how many points are awarded to the top finishers, the higher the UCI rating of a race, the more points are awarded.

The UCI ratings from highest to lowest are as follows:
 Multi-day events: 2.HC, 2.1 and 2.2
 One-day events: 1.HC, 1.1 and 1.2

Events

Final standings

References

External links
 

 
UCI Asia Tour
2016 in men's road cycling
UCI